Quest for Love is a 1971 British romantic science fiction drama film directed by Ralph Thomas and starring Joan Collins, Tom Bell and Denholm Elliott. It is based on the 1954 short story "Random Quest" by John Wyndham.

Plot
A physicist, Colin Trafford, stages a demonstration of a particle accelerator to a number of people, including Sir Henry Larnstein and Trafford's long-time friend Tom Lewis. The demonstration goes wrong and Trafford, with his same memories, finds himself in a parallel universe with significant differences from our own: John F. Kennedy is Secretary General of a still-existent League of Nations, Leslie Howard did not die in the Second World War because it never happened, and no one ever succeeded in climbing to the peak of Mount Everest. Trafford also discovers that he is a famous author, an alcoholic, and a womaniser with a beautiful wife, Ottilie. Trafford instantly falls in love with Ottilie, whereas his parallel self was constantly unfaithful to her and she is on the brink of divorcing him.

With the help of Sir Henry and the physical evidence of the absence of a childhood scar, Ottilie accepts that this 'new' Trafford is not the same man she had originally fallen in love with and married. The couple fall in love once again, but Trafford then discovers that Ottilie has a terminal heart condition that is incurable in that world. Very soon she dies in Trafford's arms. At that instant he regains consciousness in a hospital bed in his original reality, where he has been for three weeks since the accident. He determines to track down Ottilie's alter ego and finds her just in time to get her to hospital for treatment of her ailment. As she recovers, Trafford goes to visit her with a bunch of her favourite flowers and introduces himself.

Cast
 Joan Collins – Ottilie / Tracy Fletcher
 Tom Bell – Colin Trafford
 Denholm Elliott – Tom Lewis
 Laurence Naismith – Sir Henry Larnstein
 Lyn Ashley – Jennifer
 Juliet Harmer – Geraldine Lambert
 Neil McCallum – Jimmy
 Geraldine Gardner – Sylvia
 Jeremy Child – Dougie Raynes
 Ray McAnally – Jack Kahn
 Dudley Foster – Grimshaw
 Geraldine Moffat – Stella
 Simon Ward – Jeremy
 David Weston – Johnny Prescott
 Drewe Henley – Man
 Edward Cast – Jenkins 
 John Hallam – Jonathan Keene 
 Angus MacKay – Dr Rankin 
 Bernard Horsfall – Telford 
 Philip Stone – Mason 
 Sam Kydd – Taxi driver

Production
Joan Collins signed in November 1970. The film was originally called Quest.

Release

Critical reception
TV Guide called the film "an unusual science fiction tale that doesn't completely work but does hold interest...The story gets complicated, but the direction juggles the separate worlds without much trouble. Bell's performance makes this project work. He's believable and earnest, and brings it off with a guiding clarity"; Time Out, however, called the film "puerile sci-fi romance"; but DVD Talk wrote, "a surprisingly effective romance with just the barest sci-fi framework...it succeeds in large part due to the two leads' believable underplaying. Bell is on the right note from the beginning of the film, never overplaying his hand...Collins, whom too many people know only from TV's Dynasty, is simply wonderful here, creating a fully-dimensional character."

Legacy
Joan Collins later said that, out of her entire career, she was proudest of her performances in the TV series Dynasty, and the films Decadence and Quest for Love.

References

External links

Quest for Love at BFI
Quest for Love at Britmovie

1971 films
British science fiction drama films
1971 romantic drama films
1970s science fiction drama films
1970s English-language films
Films directed by Ralph Thomas
Films shot at Pinewood Studios
British alternative history films
Films based on short fiction
Films about parallel universes
Films about World War II alternate histories
1971 drama films
Films with screenplays by Terence Feely
1970s British films